St. Xavier's High School,(Telugu Medium) and Loyola High School, (English Medium)  are the private Catholic secondary school for boys, located in Loyola Town, Suryapet, Telangana, India. The school was founded by the Jesuits in 1976 as a Telugu-medium school. In 2005 an English-medium school was added but recently St. Xavier's High School was closed.

Loyola High School (St. Xavier's), Suryapet
1975 witnessed the emergence of yet another star on the Andhra Jesuit horizon: St. Xaviers, Suryapet. This time the star makers were Bishop of Warangal, Rt, Rev. Beretta (Suryapet then came under Warangal Diocese) and Fr. Balaiah. As a natural consequence of their common apostolic vision and collaboration, the school which had so far remained at the concept level was brought into reality. With the cultivation of a nursery for vocations as the primary objective and the education of Catholic Students of this area as the secondary goal, the institution took off to a start. Thanks to the generous contributions from ALC and LPS, the land was immediately bought. A local committee was set up to look after the legal and practical problems arising out of this newly bought land.

Pioneers
The days of pioneers are always hard. They often travel alone braving enormous inconveniences. The Jesuit pioneers at Suryapet were no exception to this. Fr. Arakal, after a short stay with Fr. Bonvini, the then parish priest of Suryapet., landed at the present site, and put up the first construction: a thatched roof for himself. .

The Primary objective of establishing this institution is being realized each year. At least half a dozen candidates join some congregation or the diocese. We have already Jesuit candidates and scholastics from this school. With a more concerted effort it is hoped that a number of vocations will gradually increase. Ever since the inception of this school we have always seen cent percent result in SSC examinations.

St. Xavier's High school is located in a plot of 32 acres at a distance of 5 kilometers from Suryapet on the way to Jangaom, Nalgonda District It is situated in a rural background. The foundation stone was laid on 21 September 1975. The school began to function on 1 July 1976 with three classes (6th, 7th, 8th), with a strength of 117 boys. Within the period of three years it became a full-fledged high school. Telugu is the medium of instruction. The school has been achieving cent percent result in SSC almost every year due to the hard work of the both staff and students.

Today the community consists of five Jesuits. They are mainly engaged in school education ministry. There is a Telugu medium school which was started in 1976 and an English medium school started in 2005. The type of children who study in our schools are educationally, economically, poor students.These children are the first generation to come to schools. The campus is spacious and lush green with full of trees. There is a hostel for the boys. We have three buses to ferry the children from remote villages.

Fr. kunduru Joji SJ is the superior and Correspondent of Loyola High School.

Fr. Arun Valan Andrew SJ is the English medium School Principal.

Fr. Bulla Ramesh Bosco SJ is the warden of the hostel.

Address

Loyola High school

Loyola Nagar

Gandhi Nagar Post

Suryapet – 508213, Nalgonda Dt

Tel:Res:9347536372

Web : www.loyolasuryapet.blogspot.in

See also

 List of Jesuit schools
 List of schools in Telangana

References

External links 
 St.Xavier's High School (Loyola), Suryapet at Facebook

Jesuit secondary schools in India
Christian schools in Telangana
High schools and secondary schools in Telangana
Educational institutions established in 1976
1976 establishments in Andhra Pradesh